Henry Daley Colphon (born 13 April 1970) is a Costa Rican sprinter who competed in the men's 100m competition at the 1992 Summer Olympics. He recorded an 11.11, not enough to qualify for the next round past the heats. His personal best was 10.70, set in 1992.

References

1970 births
Living people
Costa Rican male sprinters
Athletes (track and field) at the 1992 Summer Olympics
Olympic athletes of Costa Rica
Central American Games gold medalists for Costa Rica
Central American Games medalists in athletics